Miguel Ángel Rodríguez (born 18 November 1973) is an Argentine professional golfer.

Rodriguez was born in Buenos Aires. He turned professional in 1998 and has played predominantly in South America on the Tour de las Américas and the Argentine TPG Tour. He played on Europe's second tier Challenge Tour between 2005 and 2009, winning two tournaments.

Professional wins (8)

Challenge Tour wins (2)

1Co-sanctioned by the Tour de las Américas
2Co-sanctioned by the TPG Tour

Tour de las Américas wins (2)

1Co-sanctioned by the Challenge Tour
2Co-sanctioned by the TPG Tour

TPG Tour wins (5)

1Co-sanctioned by the Challenge Tour and the Tour de las Américas

Other wins (2)
2005 Siemens Venezuela Open, Salta Open (Argentina)

Results in major championships

CUT = missed the half-way cut
Note: Rodríguez only played in the U.S. Open.

References

External links

Miguel Rodríguez at the Tour de las Américas official site

Argentine male golfers
European Tour golfers
Sportspeople from Buenos Aires
1973 births
Living people